Siege of Antwerp may refer to:
 Fall of Antwerp, a 1584–1585 siege of Antwerp conducted by Spanish forces against a Dutch garrison during the Eighty Years' War
Siege of Antwerp (1789-1790), conducted by the Belgian Patriot army against the Austrians during the Brabant Revolution.
 Siege of Antwerp (1814), conducted by Allied forces against a French garrison during the War of the Sixth Coalition
 Siege of Antwerp (1832), conducted by French forces against a Dutch garrison after the Belgian Revolution's Ten Days' Campaign
 Siege of Antwerp (1914), conducted by German forces against a Belgian and British garrison during World War I

See also
 The Sack of Antwerp (1576), a Spanish Fury conducted during the Eighty Years' War
 Battle of Belgium, a 1940 battle conducted by German forces against a Belgian garrison during World War II
 Battle of the Scheldt, a 1944 battle conducted by Allied forces against a German garrison during World War II